Spilsby railway station was a railway station in the market town of Spilsby, Lincolnshire, England. The station stood on a four mile long branch line between Spilsby and Firsby Junction,  where it connected with the main line from Cleethorpes to London, and was opened on 1 May 1868.  However, traffic on the line soon slumped, and the line was bought by the Great Northern Railway in 1890. In 1939 passenger services on the line were suspended, leaving only a goods service which itself ceased in 1958, when the railway station and line were closed.

References

Further reading
Ludlam, A.J. (1985). The Spilsby to Firsby Railway: Oakwood Press.

External links
 Spilsby station on navigable 1947 O. S. map
 Spilsby at Disused Stations

Disused railway stations in Lincolnshire
Railway stations in Great Britain opened in 1868
Railway stations in Great Britain closed in 1939
Former Great Northern Railway stations
Spilsby